2013 in television may refer to
 2013 in American television for television related events in the United States.
 List of 2013 American television debuts for television debut related events in the United States.
 2013 in Australian television for television related events in Australia.
 2013 in Belgian television for television related events in Belgium.
 2013 in Brazilian television for television related events in Brazil.
 2013 in British television for television related events in Great Britain.
 2013 in Scottish television for television related events in Scotland.
 2013 in Canadian television for television related events in Canada.
 2013 in Croatian television for television related events in Croatia.
 2013 in Danish television for television related events in Denmark.
 2013 in Dutch television for television related events in the Netherlands.
 2013 in Estonian television for television related events in Estonia.
 2013 in French television for television related events in France.
 2013 in German television for television related events in Germany.
 2013 in Irish television for television related events in Ireland.
 2013 in Italian television for television related events in Italy.
 2013 in Japanese television for television related events in Japan.
 2013 in Mexican television for television related events in Mexico.
 2013 in New Zealand television for television related events in New Zealand.
 2013 in Norwegian television for television related events in Norway.
 2013 in Pakistani television for television related events in Pakistan.
 2013 in Philippine television for television related events in the Philippines.
 2013 in Polish television for television related events in Poland.
 2013 in Portuguese television for television related events in Portugal.
 2013 in South African television for television related events in South Africa.
 2013 in Spanish television for television related events in Spain.
 2013 in Swedish television for television related events in Sweden.
 2013 in Turkish television for television related events in Turkey.

 
Mass media timelines by year